The following is a list of presidents of Querétaro Municipality, Mexico. The municipality includes Querétaro City.

List of officials

 Alfonso M. Camacho, 1916-1917  
 Gonzalo Vizcaíno (interim), 1917  
 Ignacio Sanabria (interim), 1917 
 Agustín Herrera Pérez (interim), 1917 
 Alfonso Fernández de Jáuregui (interim), 1917-1919 
 Francisco J. Urquiza (interim), 1919 
 Manuel Anaya Jr. (interim), 1919 
 Hermenegildo Muñoz, 1919 
 José Villa (provisional), 1919-1920 
 Vicente Enrique Guerrero (provisional), 1920 
 Carlos A. Terán, 1920 
 Andrés Landaverde (interim), 1920-1921 
 J. Cruz Hernández (provisional), 1921 
 Ramón García Vega, 1921 
 Vicente Enrique Guerrero, 1921-1922 
 Manuel M. Pérez (interim), 1922 
 Carlos A. Terán (interim), 1922 
 José Refugio del Castillo (interim), 1922 
 Carlos A. Terán (interim), 1922-1923 
 Ricardo Olvera, 1923-1925 
 Filemón Basaldúa (interim), 1925 
 Miguel A. Herrera, 1925-1926 
 Antonio Vargas (interim), 1926-1927 
 Trinidad Gudiño, 1927-1928 
 José C. Calzada, 1928-1929 
 Agustín Casas, 1929 
 Andrés Landaverde, 1929-1930 
 Braulio M. Guerra, 1930-1931 
 Ignacio García, 1931-1932 
 Luis Aguilar S., 1932-1933 
 Benjamín Feregrino (interim), 1933 
 Enrique Omaña (interim), 1933 
 Juan J. Bermúdez, 1933-1936 
 J. Jesús Veraza (interim), 1936 
 José Santamaría Jr. (interim), 1936-1937 
 Juan C. Peña, 1937-1938 
 Corl. Juan José Pérez Tejeda (interim), 1938-1939 
 Daniel Méndez, 1939 
 Celestino Ramírez, 1939-1941 
 Arnulfo Rubio Guerrero, 1941-1943 
 Arturo Domínguez Paulín, 1943-1945 
 Samuel Palacios Borja (interim), 1945-1946 
 José C. Calzada, 1946-1949 
 Samuel Palacios Borja, 1949-1952 
 Pablo Muñoz Gutiérrez (interim), 1952 
 José Luis Herrera Pimentel, 1952-1955 
 Alvaro Larrondo Michaus, 1955-1958 
 Alonso M. Barredo, 1958-1961 
 Juventino Castro Sánchez, 1961-1964 
 José Luján Sánchez (interim), 1964 
 Ricardo Rangel Andrade, 1964-1967 
 Alejandro Esquivel Rodríguez, 1967-1970 
 Antonio Calzada Urquiza, 1970-1973 
 Manuel Trejo Vega (interim), 1973 
 Jorge Torres Vázquez, 1973-1976 
 Mariano Palacios Alcocer, 1976-1979 
 Alvaro Larrondo Ojeda, 1979-1982 
 René Martínez Gutiérrez, 1982-1985 
 Manuel Cevallos Urueta, 1985-1988 
 , 1988-1991 
 Andrés Garrido del Toral (interim), 1991 
 Alfonso Ballesteros Negrete, 1991-1994 
 Jesús Rodríguez Hernández, 1994-1997 
 Noradino Rubio Espinoza de los Monteros (interim), 1997 
 Francisco Garrido Patrón, 1997-2000 
 Rolando García Ortiz, 2000-2003 
 Armando Rivera Castillejos, 2003-2006 
 Manuel Gonzalez Valle, 2006-2009 
 Francisco Domínguez Servién, 2009-2012 
 , 2012-2015 
 Marcos Aguilar Vega, 2015-2018 
 , 2018-current

See also 
  
 
 List of presidents of Querétaro Municipality (in Spanish)

References

Querétaro
Politicians from Querétaro
History of Querétaro